David Shulman (November 12, 1912 – October 30, 2004) was an American lexicographer and cryptographer.

He contributed many early usages to the Oxford English Dictionary and is listed among "Readers and contributors from collections" for the second edition of the OED (1989).  He felt most at home in the New York Public Library, undertaking his lexicographic research there and donating many valuable items to it. He described himself as "the Sherlock Holmes of Americanisms".

He was a member of the American Cryptogram Association since 1933, and was a champion Scrabble player.

At the age of 23 he wrote "Washington Crossing the Delaware," a 14-line sonnet in which every line is an anagram of the title.

Works 
 Shulman, David. An Annotated Bibliography of Cryptography. New York, London: Garland Publishing Co., 1976.
 "Scientists Baffled: George Washington Spotted on Venus!!!" in Chapter 14: "On the Untranslatable" in Le Ton beau de Marot: In Praise of the Music of Language, by Douglas R. Hofstadter. pp. 438–439

See also
 Anagrammatic poem

Notes

External links 
 David Shulman. Obituary, reprinted in The Scotsman, Monday November 8, 2004.
 Washington Crossing the Delaware (1936) by David Shulman.  An anagramatic poem.
 NSA: The Rare Book Collection in the National Cryptologic Museum.  Contains reference to Shulman's 1976 bibliography.
 Straight From The "H" Files: The Hot Dog's True History from the web site of the National Hot Dog and Sausage Council
The Sigmund H. Danziger, Jr. Memorial Lecture in the Humanities The Sigmund H. Danziger, Jr. Memorial Lecture in the Humanities 1999–2000
 letter dated June 19, 1998 More on 'The Big Apple' from The Christian Science Monitor.  Barry Popik claims he and Gerald Cohen have the correct origin for the term.

1912 births
2004 deaths
Modern cryptographers
American lexicographers
American Scrabble players
20th-century lexicographers